Nelson Francisco Espinoza Díaz (born 22 September 1995) is a Chilean footballer who currently plays for Deportes Copiapó on loan from Universidad de Chile as a goalkeeper.

Club career
He debuted on 15 May 2014 in a match against Audax Italiano for the 2014–15 Copa Chile.

International career
He was in the Chile U20 squad for the 2015 South American U-20 Championship, but he didn't make any appearance at the tournament.

Club statistics

References

External links
 

1995 births
Living people
People from Cachapoal Province
Chilean footballers
Chile under-20 international footballers
Chilean Primera División players
Primera B de Chile players
Universidad de Chile footballers
San Luis de Quillota footballers
Deportes Magallanes footballers
Magallanes footballers
O'Higgins F.C. footballers
Deportes Copiapó footballers
2015 South American Youth Football Championship players
Association football goalkeepers
21st-century Chilean people